Thoet Thai is a tambon (subdistrict) of Mae Fa Luang District, in Chiang Rai Province, Thailand. In 2020 it had a total population of 23,392 people.

History
The subdistrict was created effective May 29, 1991 by splitting off 15 administrative villages from Mae Rai, Mae Kham.

Administration

Central administration
The tambon is subdivided into 19 administrative villages (muban).

Local administration
The whole area of the subdistrict is covered by the subdistrict administrative organization (SAO) Thoet Thai (องค์การบริหารส่วนตำบลเทอดไทย).

References

External links
Thaitambon.com on Thoet Thai

Tambon of Chiang Rai province
Populated places in Chiang Rai province